Pionia may refer to:

 Pionia (Mysia), an ancient city in the Troad and a suffragan see in the Roman Empire (see Cyzicus)
 Pionia (moth), synonym for the genus Correbia

See also 
 Paeonia (disambiguation)
 Piona